Central National Bank may refer to:

Central National Bank (Alva, Oklahoma)
Central National Bank (Richmond, Virginia)
Central National Bank (Washington, D.C.)
Central National Bank (Topeka, Kansas), listed on the NRHP in Kansas

See also
Central National Bank Building (disambiguation)